Spiders is a French video game developer founded by developers who previously worked on the game Silverfall. They specialize in action role-playing games, owing to their previous experience.
In July 2019, French publisher Bigben Interactive, now known as Nacon, announced that they had acquired Spiders. In addition to its role as service provider to other developers, in particular by porting games to Xbox 360, the studio has specialized in a specific genre, namely role-playing games.

Foundation of the studio 
Spiders was created in 2008 by former Monte Cristo developers who had worked together the previous year on the game Silverfall. Wanting to stay together after the completion of this game, some developers team up to found Spiders. Jehanne Rousseau is the director.

Games

Game engine

All Spiders games are produced and developed using the company's own modified version of Sony's PhyreEngine, called the "Silk Engine". It includes most of the features of its parent engine, and is modified to add its own unique features.

References

External links
Giant Bomb article
Spiders at MobyGames
Spiders at UVL

Video game development companies
Video game companies of France
French companies established in 2008
Video game companies established in 2008
Companies based in Paris
2019 mergers and acquisitions
Nacon